The 2008 Short Track Speed Skating World Cup was a multi-race tournament over a season for short track speed skating. The season began on 19 October 2007 and ended on 10 February 2008.

Men

Events

World Cup Rankings

Women

Events

World Cup Rankings

See also
 2008 World Short Track Speed Skating Championships
 2008 World Short Track Speed Skating Team Championships
 2008 European Short Track Speed Skating Championships

References
 Results

ISU Short Track Speed Skating World Cup
World Cup
World Cup